Heilman is a surname, found in particular in the U.S, either as a variation of the German/Alsacian surname Heilmann belonging to some protestant families in the south-west of Germany, or from other origins ("heilman" seems to be in Poland the surname of some Jewish families, cf. Anna Heilman below).

Notable people with the surname include:

Aaron Heilman (born 1978), American baseball player
Anna Heilman (1928–2011), Polish resistance fighter
Dan Heilman (1922–1966), American comic strip cartoonist
E. Bruce Heilman, American college and university president
James Heilman, Canadian physician
John Heilman, American politician
John B. Heilman (1920–2013), American politician
Kenneth Heilman (born 1938), American neurologist
M. Stephen Heilman (born 1933), American physician and inventor
Robert B. Heilman (1906–2004), American educator and writer
Samuel Heilman (born 1946), American sociologist and writer
William Heilman (1824–1890), American politician
William Clifford Heilman (1877–1946), American classical composer

See also
Heilman Glacier, glacier of Antarctica
Heilman, Indiana, a community in the United States
Heilmann